, better known by his ringname "brother" Yasshi (stylised as "brother" YASSHI), is a Japanese professional wrestler, known for his appearances in El Dorado Wrestling, Dragon Gate, and All Japan Pro Wrestling. He is currently working for Pro Wrestling Zero1. He was an amateur wrestler before becoming a pro wrestler.

Career

Toryumon – Japan
Tsujimoto debuted in Toryumon Japan as part of the T2P class as Stevie "brother" Tsujimoto.  He was ranked second, roughly tied with Masato Yoshino, but far behind Milano Collection AT. Both he and Yoshino would join Milano's faction The Italian Connection, renaming to Yassini and Yossino respectively. Tsujimoto did not like his new name, and after arguing with Milano, settled on "brother Yassini".

The Italian Connection began showing a divide, as Milano and Yossino were face oriented, whereas Yassini and fellow ItaCon stablemates Condotti Shuji, Bakery Yagi and Berlinetta Boxer were all heels. Yassini and Shuji would split from the ItaCon when they attacked Milano and Yossino with blue boxes.  They renamed to brother Yasshi and Shuji Kondo respectively, and as of 2008 have remained together.  Kondo and Yasshi brought Toru Owashi and Shogo Takagi (the unmasked Berlinetta Boxer) into their group, and renamed to Hagure Gundam.

Dragon Gate – Aagan Iisou
Veteran Dragon Gate wrestler Masaaki Mochizuki joined Hagure Gundam as the leader.  The stable renamed to Aagan Iisou, which means roughly Villains all wear the same colors.  They added Takuya Sugawara into the mix shortly after.  Kondo, Yasshi and Sugawara formed a regular three man tag team.  Kondo and Mochizuki began to argue over who was the ace of the stable, and Aagan sided with Kondo, kicking Mochi out of the group.

All five members of Aagan Iisou – Kondo, Yasshi, Sugawara, Owashi and Takagi – were fired from Dragon Gate on December 31, 2004, for controversial and mostly unexplained reasons.

All Japan Pro Wrestling
After Kondo and Yasshi were fired from Dragon Gate, they surfaced in AJPW as part of DG alumni TARU's stable Voodoo Murders.

Dragondoor/El Dorado
Yasshi and Kondo reprised their alliance in the short lived Dragondoor promotion, as well as their three-man tag team with Takuya Sugawara. Although Toru Owashi and Shogo Takagi were both in the promotion, a full reunion of Aagan Iisou never happened.

In El Dorado, Yasshi split from Kondo for the first time since their early days in the Italian Connection.  Yasshi returned to the wrestling and Llave style he used in the early days of his career, and formed a stable of his own called the Nanking Fucking Wrestling Team alongside high school wrestling teammates Masaki Okimoto and Yuji Hino.  It did not last long as he made few attempts to expand it, and after losing a match to Kondo in which the loser disbanded his faction, Yasshi reformed his alliance with Kondo.

Yasshi retired in February 2009.

Diamond Ring
On December 9, 2012, Yasshi made a special appearance in Kensuke Sasaki's Diamond Ring. On February 11, 2013, he, Taru, Kazunari Murakami, Kengo Nishimura, Kento Miyahara and Taishi Takizawa reformed the Voodoo Murders, with Yasshi positioned as the leader of the group.

Return to Dragon Gate
On February 4, 2016, Yasshi returned to Dragon Gate, 11 years after his controversial firing, and reunited with his former Italian Connection stablemate Masato Yoshino. On May 11, Yasshi returned once again and joined Verserk.

Championships and accomplishments
All Japan Pro Wrestling
All Asia Tag Team Championship (1 time) – with Shuji Kondo
January 3 Korakuen Hall Junior Heavyweight Battle Royal (2006, 2007, 2009) 
Aquamarine Cup Tag Tournament (2005) – with Shuji Kondo
Pro Wrestling Zero1
NWA International Lightweight Tag Team Championship (2 times) – with Takuya Sugawara
Tokyo Sports
Tag Team of the Year (2006)- with Taru, Suwama, & Shuji Kondo 
Toryumon Japan
UWA World Trios Championship (2 times) – with Milano Collection A.T. and Yossino (1), and Condotti Shuji and Toru Owashi (1)

Mixed martial arts record

|-
| Loss
|align=center|0–1
| Takasuke Kume
|Submission (rear naked choke)
|HEAT 4
|
|align=center|2
|align=center|3:07
|Tokyo, Japan
|

Footnotes

References

1982 births
Japanese male professional wrestlers
Living people
People from Kyoto Prefecture
All Asia Tag Team Champions
UWA World Trios Champions
21st-century professional wrestlers
UWA World Junior Heavyweight Champions
UWA World Light Heavyweight Champions